Lydia of Thyatira is a woman mentioned in the New Testament who is regarded as the first documented convert to Christianity in Europe. Several Christian denominations have designated her a saint.

Lydia
The name, "Lydia", meaning "the Lydian woman", by which she was known indicates that she was from Lydia in Asia Minor. Though she is commonly known as "St. Lydia" or even more simply "The Woman of Purple," Lydia is given other titles: "of Thyatira," "Purpuraria," and "of Philippi ('Philippisia' in Greek)." "[Lydia's] name is an ethnicon, deriving from her place of origin". The first refers to her place of birth, which is a city in the Greek region of Lydia. The second comes from the Latin word for purple and relates to her connection with purple dye. Philippi was the city in which Lydia was living when she met St. Paul and his companions. All these titles expound upon this woman's background.

New Testament narrative 
Acts 16 describes Lydia as follows:

Wayne Grudem sees the story of Lydia as being an example of effectual calling.

Background 
Lydia was most likely from Greek background, since originating from Asia Minor, but probably romanized one, while she lived in a Roman settlement. Lydia insisted on giving hospitality to Apostle Paul and his companions in Philippi. They stayed with her until their departure, through Amphipolis and Apollonia, to Thessalonica (Acts 16:40–17:1).

Paul, Silas and Timothy were traveling through the region of Philippi when they encounter "a reputable businesswoman and possibly a widow... [who] was a righteous Gentile or 'God-fearer' attracted to Judaism". "[S]he was one of a large group [considered]... sympathizers with Judaism, believers in the one God, but who had not yet become 'proselytes' or taken the final step to conversion to Judaism".

Because these encounters and events take place "in what is now Europe," Lydia is considered "the first 'European' Christian convert".

Profession
"Thyatira in the province of Lydia (located in what is now western Turkey) was famous for the red [variety of purple] dye". Lydia of Thyatira is most known as a "seller" or merchant of purple cloth, which is the likely reason for the Catholic Church naming her "patroness of dyers." It is unclear as to if Lydia simply dealt in the trade of purple dye or whether her business included textiles as well, though all known icons of the saint depict her with some form of purple cloth. Most portray this holy woman wearing a purple shawl or veil, which allows many historians and theologians to believe that she was a merchant of specifically purple cloth.

Social status
There is some speculation regarding Lydia's social status. Theologians disagree as to whether Lydia was a free woman or servant. "There is no direct evidence that Lydia had once been a slave, but the fact that her name is her place of origin rather than a personal name suggests this as at least a possibility". Ascough cites other examples of noble women named Lydia from the first or second centuries, so it is unlikely that she was actually a slave or servant. Furthermore, the book of Acts records, "When she and the members of her household were baptized, she invited us to her home. "If you consider me a believer in the Lord," she said, "come and stay at my house." And she persuaded us." This implies that Lydia was in charge of the household, as she was able to persuade the household to be baptised, and had authority in the home to invite Paul and his companions to stay in her house – both things that a servant would be far less able to do.

Marital status
Because women did not possess the same equality rights as modern women, it appears unusual that Lydia would be capable of inviting a group of foreign men to her house without a man's consent. "The fact that there is no mention of a man has been used to deduce that she was a widow, but this has been challenged as a patriarchal interpretation". Lydia's evident social power exemplified by her control of a household and ownership of a house (which she offered to St. Paul and his companions) indicates that she was most likely a free woman and possibly a widow.

Feast day
Many Christian denominations recognize Lydia of Thyatira as a saint, though her feast day varies greatly. In the Catholic Church, her feast day is August 3.

The Episcopal Church honors St. Lydia along in its liturgical calendar on May 21.

Eastern Orthodox Churches remember Lydia on various days, with some jurisdictions remembering her twice during a liturgical year. Many Eastern Orthodox churches, including the Self-Ruled Antiochian Orthodox Christian Archdiocese of North America, remember St. Lydia on May 20. However, some divisions of the Russian Orthodox Church (other than the Orthodox Church in America) observe both June 25 and March 27 as her feast days.

The Lutheran community is also divided. The ELCA commemorates Sts. Lydia, Dorcas and Phoebe on January 27, while the LCMS celebrates the three women on October 25.

Devotion
Devotion to St. Lydia is greater in the Orthodox Church than in the Latin Rite of the Roman Catholic Church, and this is evident by the myriad of icons depicting this woman. The Orthodox Churches have given her the title of "Equal to the Apostles," which signifies her importance and level of holiness. There is a church located in Philippi, which many consider to be built in St. Lydia's honor. A modern baptistry is located on the traditional site in Krynides where Lydia was baptized by St. Paul near Philippi as well.

See also

 Deborah
 Feminist theology
 Junia (New Testament person)
 Phoebe

References

External links
 SantiEBeati.it: Lydia of Thyatira

1st-century Christian female saints
Ancient Philippi
Saints from Roman Anatolia
Converts to Christianity from pagan religions
People in Acts of the Apostles
Women in the New Testament
Lydians
Ancient businesswomen
Christian saints from the New Testament
1st-century Romans
1st-century Roman women
Ancient Roman businesspeople
Anglican saints